Jason King (born 21 March 1981) is a sports administrator who currently works for the NRL. King is an Australian former professional rugby league footballer who played in the 2000s and 2010s. A New South Wales State of Origin representative front row forward, King played his club football in Sydney for the Northern Eagles and Manly-Warringah Sea Eagles, with whom he won the 2008 NRL Premiership. He also represented City Origin.

Biography
King was born in the Sydney suburb of Frenchs Forest. He became a Manly-Warringah junior rugby league footballer.  Jason attended St Augustine's College in Alfred Road, Brookvale graduating in the Class of 1998 being the winner of the prestigious Aggregate Cup awarded annually by the college to the student who excels in Study, Conduct and Sport. Jason is now a husband, father of 3, and uncle to many kids, including Ava Gray and her very cute dog, Henry.

Playing career

2000s
King made his National Rugby League debut from the bench for the Northern Eagles in a 42–14 loss to the Brisbane Broncos at the NorthPower Stadium in Gosford on 1 September in Round 26 of the 2001 NRL season. In 2002, King became a permanent figure in the Northern Eagles team, playing 22 games for the season and scoring two tries. He scored his first try in the top grade in a 36–12 win over the Canberra Raiders in Round 6 in Gosford.

From the 2003 NRL season, the Northern Eagles were no more and the Manly-Warringah club was back in the premiership (the Northern Eagles had been the result of an uneasy merger between Manly and their local rivals the North Sydney Bears). By this time King had cemented his place in the side and would remain with Manly for the remainder of his career.

After lean times with the Northern Eagles and in the first couple of seasons at Manly, things turned around at the club under the coaching of former Sea Eagles Australian international Des Hasler. After not appearing in the finals since 1998, Manly were back in the picture in 2005, though their season ended with a 46–22 loss to traditional rivals Parramatta in the Qualifying Final.

King's form in 2005 saw him gain his first selection for City Origin. He was selected on the bench as City defeated Country Origin 29–22 at the Oakes Oval in Lismore. King would also play for City Origin in 2006 and 2007.

Manly were one of the form teams of the 2007 NRL season and qualified for their first Grand Final since 1997. King's first Grand Final experience was soured as the Manly club were defeated 34-8 by the Melbourne Storm.

Manly, with Jason King forming a strong front row rotation with test forward Brent Kite and former Newcastle Knights prop Josh Perry, maintained their form in the 2008 NRL season and the Grand Final would again see the Sea Eagles come up against Melbourne. This time however Manly-Warringah were in superlative form after easily accounting for St. George Illawarra and New Zealand Warriors in the Qualifying and Preliminary Finals. The 2008 NRL Grand Final would see Manly win by a record margin of 40–0 over Melbourne. Despite playing on the bench in the Grand Final win over Melbourne, King was later voted Rugby League Players Association clubman of the year

King then went on to play in the front row in Manly's 28–20 win in the 2009 World Club Challenge over Super League champions the Leeds Rhinos at the Elland Road stadium in Leeds, England.

2010s
In the 2010 season, King was appointed co-captain of Manly alongside Jamie Lyon. King's form improved during 2010 to the point where he was the 18th man for the New South Wales Origin team for Game 2 of the 2010 State of Origin series, and made his Origin debut in the front row in Game 3 of the series at the Telstra Stadium in Sydney. His form continued for the season despite the patchy form of the Sea Eagles. Unfortunately for King injury ruled him out of the Australian Kangaroos train on squad for the 2010 Four Nations tournament.

On 15 May 2011, King was named in the New South Wales Origin team for game 1 of the 2011 series at Suncorp Stadium in Brisbane where Queensland defeated The Blues 16–12. This would prove to be the final State of Origins game of King's career.

Despite a strong start to the 2011 NRL season, a late season injury forced King to watch from the sidelines as Manly defeated the New Zealand Warriors 24–10 in the 2011 NRL grand final.

King returned to the team in 2012 as Manly made their way to the Preliminary Final. An injury interrupted 2013 season saw him play only four games and miss Manly's 26-18 2013 NRL Grand Final loss to the Sydney Roosters.

King was still co-captain of Manly-Warringah in the 2014 NRL season, though he played mostly from the bench. King retired at the end of the year after 22 games for the Northern Eagles and 217 games for Manly.

References

External links
 Manly Sea Eagles Player Profile

1981 births
Australian rugby league administrators
Australian rugby league players
Manly Warringah Sea Eagles players
Manly Warringah Sea Eagles captains
Northern Eagles players
New South Wales City Origin rugby league team players
New South Wales Rugby League State of Origin players
Prime Minister's XIII players
Rugby league props
Rugby league players from Sydney
Living people